Leonard Halford Dudley Buxton FSA (1889–1939) was a British anthropologist. He was educated at Radley and Exeter College, Oxford, and he was Reader in Physical Anthropology at the University of Oxford between 1928 and 1939. He conducted field work in Sudan, India, Malta, the United States, China and Mesopotamia, and in 1913 he excavated Lapithos in Cyprus under the direction of professor John Myres and Cyprus Museum curator Menelaos Markides. During his extensive travels he documented his work through photography; the pictures are currently in the Pitt Rivers Museum. In the 1930s he carried research in Oxford with anthropologist Beatrice Blackwood. He collected textiles that are currently in the Pitt Rivers Museum in Oxford, the Bankfield Museum in Halifax and the British Museum. From 1914-1918 he served with the Cameron Highlanders in France and in the Intelligence Service.

Publications 

M. B. Ray and L. H. Dudley Buxton, Some pathological and other conditions observed among the human remains from a prehistoric Ethiopian cemetery in the Southern Sudan (1914).
The anthropology of Cyprus (1920).
The Inhabitants of the Eastern Mediterranean (1920).
 Notes on Cypriot Textiles (1921).
  The Eastern Road. London (1924).
 Primitive Labour (1924).
Künstlich deformierte Schädel von Cypern (1931).
A Cloisonne Staff-head from Cyprus (1932).
An Introduction to Oxfordshire Folklore, Folklore (1934).
Measurements of Oxfordshire Villagers, The Journal of the Royal Anthropological Institute of Great Britain and Ireland (1939).
The peoples of Asia London: Dawsons (1968).

External links 

 Photographic collection is searchable in the Photographic Collection of the Pitt Rivers Museum.
 Ethnographic and antiquities collection in the Pitt Rivers Museum.
 Cypriot ethnographic collection, mainly textiles, in the British Museum.

References 

British anthropologists
1889 births
1939 deaths
People associated with the Pitt Rivers Museum
Fellows of the Society of Antiquaries of London
20th-century anthropologists
Alumni of Exeter College, Oxford